Daegu Metropolitan Jungang Library is a municipal library in Daegu Jung-gu, South Korea. It opened on 10 August 1919. The collection currently consists of 469,559 books and 34,236 papers.

External links
Library home page
Daegu Metropolitan Jungang Library (English page)

1919 establishments in Korea
Government buildings completed in 1985
Library buildings completed in 1985
Libraries in Daegu
Jung District, Daegu
Libraries established in 1919